HMS Strongbow was an M-class destroyer built for the British Royal Navy during the First World War. The ship was launched in September 1916 and entered service in November that year.

Construction and design
HMS Strongbow was ordered from Yarrow Shipbuilders in July 1915 as part of the Sixth War Programme of shipbuilding for the Royal Navy. Strongbow  was built as a Yarrow "special", to Yarrow's own design rather than to the Admiralty's own design for the M-class destroyer. Yarrow's design used direct-drive steam turbines rather than the geared turbines of the Admiralty design, and had two funnels rather than three. As such, they more closely resembled Yarrow R-class Specials, and are referred to as Yarrow R-class ships in some sources.

Three Yarrow boilers fed Parsons turbines, driving two propeller shafts and generating . Armament consisted of three QF Mark IV 4 inch (102 mm) guns, with a single 2-pounder (40-mm) "pom-pom" anti-aircraft gun and four 21 inch (533 mm) torpedo tubes. The ship had a crew of 82 officers and men.

Strongbow was launched from Yarrow's Glasgow shipyard on 30 September 1916 and was completed in November that year.

Service
Following commissioning, Strongbow joined the Twelfth Destroyer Flotilla of the Grand Fleet, with the pennant number G.44. Strongbow was one of eight destroyers detached to Lerwick in the Shetland Islands, with the duty of escorting the regular convoys from Scandinavia to the United Kingdom.

On 16 October 1917, Strongbow joined a westbound convoy of 12 merchant ships from Norway. The escort consisted of Strongbow, the destroyer  and two naval trawlers. Strongbow sighted two unknown ships at 06:00, in poor visibility, and believing them to be Royal Navy cruisers, challenged them with recognition signals. Strongbow quickly received heavy damage and was immobilised, and after ensuring that all confidential papers had been destroyed, the captain ordered the surviving crew to abandon ship. Mary Rose, which had been ahead of the convoy, and only realised that the convoy was under attack when her crew heard gunfire, was also quickly sunk, as were nine of the merchant vessels. Neither destroyer managed to make a radio report of the attack, and the two German cruisers escaped unscathed. Forty-six of Strongbows crew were killed in the attack.

Notes

References

 

 

R-class destroyers (1916)
Ships built on the River Clyde
1916 ships
World War I destroyers of the United Kingdom
Maritime incidents in 1917
World War I shipwrecks in the North Sea